Kertesziomyia is a genus of 14 Hoverflies, from the family Syrphidae, in the order Diptera.

They are very similar to Eristalinus, but Kertesziomyia is defined by having a postalar pile tuft but lacking the pile on posterior portions of the anepimeron and not having patterns on the eyes typical of Eristalinus.

Species
K. aeneicincta (Meijere, 1929)
K. calliphoroides (Shiraki, 1968)
K. cyanea (Brunetti, 1913)
K. distincta (Meijere, 1913)
K. formosana (Shiraki, 1930)
K. neptuna (Meijere, 1911)
K. penangensis (Curran, 1931)
K. perakensis (Curran, 1928)

References

Diptera of Asia
Diptera of Australasia
Hoverfly genera
Eristalinae